Roni Medeiros de Moura (born 15 April 1999), also known as "El Tranquilo"  or simply as Roni, is a Brazilian professional footballer who plays as a midfielder for Corinthians.

Club career

Corinthians

Roni started his career when he was 5 years old at Corinthians. He was part of the 2017 Copa São Paulo de Futebol Júnior squad that ended up as champion.

Coming through the youth system, Roni made his professional debut for Corinthians in a 2020 Campeonato Brasileiro Série A home match against Bahia on 16 September 2020, also scoring his first goal in the 3–2 win.

Career statistics

Club

References

External links

 

Footballers from São Paulo
Brazilian footballers
Association football midfielders
Sport Club Corinthians Paulista players
Campeonato Brasileiro Série A players
1999 births
Living people